Beeson Run is a stream in the U.S. state of West Virginia.

Beeson Run has the name of Jonas Beeson, a pioneer settler.

See also
List of rivers of West Virginia

References

Rivers of Wood County, West Virginia
Rivers of West Virginia